According to the University of Alberta, a sensitivity reader is someone who reads a literary work, looking for perceived offensive content, stereotypes and bias, creating a report for an author or publisher with suggested changes. 

Proponents state "the literary quality of a work is substantially improved" when reviewed and copy-edited by others from "a specific Nation or community that the author is writing about". Helen Wicks, managing director for children's trade at Bonnier, defended the practice by stating that "we believe sensitivity reads can play an important role in inclusive, forward-thinking publishing." Critics accuse sensitivity readers of being "new moral gatekeepers", offering a way to "cancel-proof your book".

The use of sensitivity readers have attracted controversy from authors and the public. Anthony Horowitz and Kate Clanchy have both criticized the impact of sensitivity readers on their books, the latter ultimately breaking with publisher Picador after controversy surrounding her memoir.

Controversies

In February 2023, Puffin Books, a division of Penguin Books, announced that they would be re-writing portions of many of Roald Dahl's children's novels, changing the language to, in the publisher's words, "ensure that it can continue to be enjoyed by all today." The alterations were recommended by sensitivity readers at the organization Inclusive Minds. The decision was met with criticism from groups and public figures including PEN America, Salman Rushdie, Brian Cox, Rishi Sunak, and Kemi Badenoch. Camilla, Queen Consort, also made remarks during a speech, which were widely interpreted as a condemnation of Puffin's announcement. In Matilda, references to Joseph Conrad and Rudyard Kipling were replaced by references to Jane Austen and John Steinbeck. In The Witches, which features a group of witches who wear wigs, a new sentence was added in which the practice of whig-wearing among women is defended. Several days later, Puffin announced that after "[listening] to the debate over the past week", they would also continue to sell the original, uncensored editions of Roald Dahl's children's novels, under the title The Roald Dahl Classic Collection.

In 2023, it was reported that Ian Fleming's James Bond series was being re-published, with many references to race removed. A  disclaimer was added at the beginning of each book, reading "This book was written at a time when terms and attitudes which might be considered offensive by modern readers were commonplace. A number of updates have been made in this edition, while keeping as close as possible to the original text and the period in which it is set."

See also
 Expurgation (also known as Bowdlerisation)

References

Types of editors